Stamford Bridge may refer to:

 Stamford Bridge, East Riding of Yorkshire, a village in England
 Battle of Stamford Bridge, 25 September 1066
 Stamford Bridge (bridge), a bridge in the village of Stamford Bridge
 Stamford Bridge (stadium), in London
 Stamford Bridge (Cedar Butte, South Dakota), United States, a bridge on the National Register of Historic Places